College of Horticulture Mudigere is a horticulture college located in Mudigere, Karnataka, India. Established in 1991, it is affiliated to the University of Agricultural and Horticultural Sciences, Shivamogga and was previously affiliated to the University of Horticultural Sciences, Bagalkot. This horticultural education center is the oldest in Karnataka. The college has been accredited by the Indian Council of Agricultural Research since 25 August 2004.

History
University of Agricultural Sciences, Bangalore started a degree program in horticulture at Bengaluru, first of its kind in India established during 1970. Later during 1991–1992 it was shifted to Mudigere, Chikkamagaluru District, by establishing a College of Horticulture Mudigere. The college has been offering an undergraduate program since its inception and M.Sc. (Hort.) program since 2010–11.

Location
The college is located in Western Ghats about 4 km southwest of Mudigere (13,7,N 74,37,E 970m above Mean Sea Level) beside the Mudigere-Hassan main road. The annual rainfall is typically very high ranging from 3000 mm to 3500 mm.

Infrastructure

The college is well equipped with spacious class rooms, various laboratories, audio visual teaching aids, crop museum, glass houses, poly houses, plant conservatory and sufficient land for field experiments. The teaching process is supported by library and computer center with ARIS network.  For students accommodation at the campus, separate mess and hostels for boys and girls are available with Wi-Fi. For the accommodation of the guests, visiting professors and scientists guest houses are built within the campus. Outdoor as well as indoor sport stadiums encourages sports activity among students.

Crop museums on different horticultural crops within the campus includes plantation and spice crops, fruit crops, vegetable crops; floriculture and landscape gardening. It provides an added advantage and good opportunities for the students for practical learning.

The college also has a zonal agricultural research station within the campus which helps for practical teaching purpose on various horticultural crops and to involve in on going research works.

Extension Education Unit and Krishi Vignyana Kendra on the campus conducts various on campus and off campus training programmes, transfer of technologies, demonstrations, crop seminars on various horticulture and agricultural crops for the benefit of the farmers of the surrounding region.

Academic profile

Boards and Courses

Undergraduate Courses
COH Mudigere offers Bachelor of Science (B.Sc.) 4 year degree in horticulture which covers the following disciplines:
  Floriculture & landscape architecture
 Fruit science (pomology)
  Plantation, spices, medicinal and aromatic crops
 Horticulture entomology
 Vegetable science (Olericulture)
 Crop improvement and biotechnology
 Post harvest technology
 Natural resource management

Postgraduate Courses
The college offers 2 years degree of Master of Science (M.Sc.) in the following subjects.
  Floriculture and landscape architecture
 Fruit science (pomology)
  Plantation, spices, medicinal and aromatic crops
 Horticulture entomology
 Genetics and Plant Breeding
 Vegetable science (olericulture)

Eligibility criteria

For admission into B.Sc. Horticulture Course
The admission policy follows the requirements of the Indian Council of Agricultural Research. Students must have passed pre-university examination of Karnataka or equivalent examination with the combination of PCMB subjects.  The admission of candidates is based on the reservation policies of the state government and candidates from rural areas with agricultural background are given due preference.

For admission into M.Sc. Horticulture Course
Aspirants must qualify through junior research fellow or PGCET state entrance exams or the equivalent.

Research

Research work done by the college of horticulture & Zonal Agricultural and Horticultural Research Station, Mudigere

Caramom, Cashew, Spices and Horticultural Crops

Crop Improvement-New Varieties

Crop Protection

Crop Management

Paddy

Crop Improvement-New Varieties

Crop Protection

Crop Management

Agro-Forestry, Soil and Water Conservation and Sericulture

Animal Management and Fisheries

Research on other crops

References

External links
 COH Mudigere (official website)
 UAHS Bangalore (university website)
 Indian Council of Agricultural Research

Horticultural organisations based in India
Agricultural universities and colleges in Karnataka
Universities and colleges in Chikkamagaluru district
Colleges in Karnataka